I Wanna Be with You is the reissue of American singer Mandy Moore's debut studio album, So Real (1999). It was released in May 2000 through Epic Records, five months after the release of its parent album. Internationally, I Wanna Be with You was released as Moore's debut album as opposed to So Real. The album has sold over 805,000 copies in the United States.

Worldwide, the album was released in a variety of formats. The album was marketed as "a new version of Mandy's debut", containing five new songs, three remixes, and four songs from So Real. The UK edition of the album has an alternative track list, featuring the five new songs but omitting the remixes and borrowing more heavily from So Real, with eight songs being featured from that album. The Japanese bonus track edition of the album features all of the songs from So Real, except "Love Shot".

The first single from the album in the United States, also titled "I Wanna Be with You", was a moderate commercial success, peaking at number twenty-four on the US Billboard Hot 100 and being certified gold.

Singles
In the United Kingdom, where So Real was not released, "Candy" was marketed as a release from I Wanna Be with You. The single peaked at number six on the UK Singles Chart.

"I Wanna Be with You" was the first single released from the album in the US and the second single internationally. It spent 16 weeks on the Billboard Hot 100, and reached number 24 in its ninth week on the chart. The single was more successful in Australia, spending over 25 weeks in the top 100 and reaching number 11 on the ARIA charts. It also hit number 21 in the UK, becoming her second and last single to chart there, as well as her second top forty single.

"So Real" was released as a single on June 13, 2000 and peaked at number 21 in Australia.

"Walk Me Home" was first released on December 6, 1999 as the second single in the US from So Real, but did not chart. In October 2000, the song was re-released to promote I Wanna Be with You, peaking at #38 on Billboard Pop 100 chart.

Critical reception

The album received generally mixed reviews from music critics. Many reviewers were critical of the album containing material from So Real, with Rickey Wright from Amazon writing that the album was released "mainly to ride the success of its title single" and Rolling Stone describing the album as "reconfigured, slightly improved reissue" of So Real. Stephen Thomas Erlewine of AllMusic called the album a "crass marketing move" and Linda Ryan of Rhapsody described the release as "ostentatious". Despite this, both Erlewine and Ryan described the album as stronger than its predecessor. Erlewine noted that the album contained "all [the] essential ingredients for a good teen pop album" and Ryan described the remixes on the album as "slick and radio-friendly". Wright was critical of the Wade Robson remixes, calling them "inferior", and described So Real as "the better of her releases". 

Danny Scott from Q compared the album to works of Christina Aguilera and Britney Spears, describing it as "predictably polished and irrepressibly upbeat". In contrast, James Roberts from Dotmusic described the production style on the album as being different from the works of Spears, writing "there is more to Mandy than most who heard 'Candy' would give her credit for."

Commercial performance
I Wanna Be with You debuted at number 21 on the US Billboard 200, selling 58,000 copies in its first week. It was eventually certified gold in the US for shipments of 500,000 copies.

In New Zealand, the album peaked at number six.

Track listing

Notes
 signifies a remixer

Personnel
Credits for I Wanna Be with You adapted from AllMusic.

 Mandy Moore – primary artist
 Tiffany Arbuckle – backing vocals
 Alan Armitage – assistant engineer
 Chris Athens – mastering
 Eric Bickel – assistant engineer
 Chris Braide – guitar
 Dakari – guest artist
 Jive – guest artist
 Billy Lawrence – guest artist
 Alice Butts – design
 Tom Coyne – mastering
 Richard Dodd – cello
 Fraser T. Smith – guitar
 Terry Glenny – violin
 Eric Gorfain – string arrangements, violin
 Kenny Greenberg – electric guitar
 David Guerrero – assistant engineer
 Bobby Guy – producer
 Roland Hartwell – violin
 José Juan Sánchez – assistant
 Shaun Shankel – digital editing, editing, production coordination
 Dan Shea – keyboards, producer, programming
 Roger Sommers – engineer, mixing
 Manelich Sotolong – assistant engineer
 Soul Solution – producer
 Tom Tally – viola
 Keith Thomas – arranger, bass, drum programming, acoustic guitar, producer, programming, synthesizer, synthesizer programming
 Nick Trevisick – producer, programming
 Marcy Vaj – violin
 Bill Whittington – engineer, mixing
 Robb Williams – engineer
 John Yoakum – flute, oboe
 Dan Muckala – programming
 David Palmer – drums
 Julian Peploe – art direction
 Wade Robson – producer, remix producer
 Corey Rooney – keyboards, mixing, producer, programming
 Ken Ross – executive producer
 Jose Sanchez – programming

Charts

Weekly charts

Year-end charts

Certifications

|}

References

2000 albums
Mandy Moore albums
Epic Records albums
Albums produced by Cory Rooney